Kenzie MacNeil  (2 September 1952 – 24 July 2021) was a Canadian songwriter, performer, producer and director in television, film, radio and stage, and a former Conservative Party of Canada candidate. MacNeil completed a Bachelor of Arts degree from St. Francis Xavier University. He also studied at the University of Botswana in Lesotho and Swaziland while accompanying his parents on field work with CIDA in Africa for three years.

Biography
MacNeil was a major force behind The Rise and Follies of Cape Breton Island, a satirical sketch review that ran from 1978 to 1982. The revue included songs inspired by the coal and steel industry of Cape Breton and featured local musicians. He also served as Artistic Director/Producer of  the Cape Breton Music and Theatre Company, and worked as Director of the UCCB Press.

Over the years he contributed to Peter Gzowski's This Country in the Morning and Morningside on CBC Radio, and on some of the most popular television shows of the time: Singalong Jubilee, Ceilidh, Tommy Hunter, Ryan’s Fancy, Ian Tyson, and many others. Kenzie MacNeil also had an active theatrical career performing in productions like Tom Gallant's Step/Dance and with Gordon Pinsent in John and the Missus, and was nominated for an ACTRA award for Best Supporting Actor for his work in Last Night in Town. He was involved in the production of the National Film Board's Empty Harbours, Empty Dreams, 12,000 Men, and Scoggie. As well, MacNeil worked as Chair of the Nova Scotia Film Development Corporation and helped with the creation of soundstages across the mainland and on the Island, and in particular, assisted with bringing the productions Pit Pony and New Waterford Girl to Cape Breton.

MacNeil is best known for his song “The Island,” which was declared the official Cape Breton anthem in 1985. The song is a tribute to coal industry workers in Nova Scotia.  According to Men of the Deeps musical director, John O'Donnell, "the words offer a vivid demonstration that labour in Cape Breton has indeed had a deep cultural impact on the community."
He also worked as a development officer with the Nova Scotia Department of Economic Development,  and has been the editor and publisher of the Cape Bretoner magazine.

Politics
MacNeil ran as a Conservative Party of Canada in Cape Breton—Canso in the 2004 and 2006 federal elections, coming third and second respectively behind Liberal incumbent Rodger Cuzner. In the 2019 federal election, MacNeil ran as an independent candidate in Sydney—Victoria, but finished in sixth place.

Personal
MacNeil died on 24 July 2021. He was posthumously awared the Order of Nova Scotia in 2022.

Electoral record

References

External links
 
 

1952 births
2021 deaths
Canadian songwriters
Canadian male stage actors
Canadian people of Scottish descent
Conservative Party of Canada candidates for the Canadian House of Commons
Nova Scotia candidates for Member of Parliament
People from Sydney, Nova Scotia
University of Botswana alumni
St. Francis Xavier University alumni